Dipali Biswas (born 2 August 1970) is an Indian politician and member of the West Bengal Legislative Assembly. She was elected as the representative of the Gazole constituency in the 2016 West Bengal Legislative Assembly election as a candidate of the Communist Party of India (Marxist). In 2016, she switched her party to Trinamool Congress and in 2020, she switched to the Bharatiya Janata Party (BJP).

Personal life 
Dipali Biswas is married to Ranjit Biswas and a resident of Gazole Town in the district of Malda, West Bengal. She was educated at the Bardanga Raghunath High School and became an Integrated Child Development Services worker.

Political career 
In the 2016 West Bengal Legislative Assembly election, Dipali Biswas was nominated to contest from the Gazole constituency in West Bengal as the candidate of the Communist Party of India (Marxist). The election resulted in Biswas emerging as the winning candidate with a margin of over 20,000 votes and polling at 43.47% of the votes cast against 32.95% of the votes cast in favor of Sushil Chandra Roy of the Trinamool Congress and 14.51% of the votes cast in favor of Sudhanshu Sarkar of the BJP.

In 2018, she joined the Trinamool Congress party, and on 19 December 2020, she joined the Bharatiya Janata Party.

References 

1970 births
Living people
West Bengal MLAs 2016–2021
Women in West Bengal politics
Communist Party of India (Marxist) politicians from West Bengal
Bharatiya Janata Party politicians from West Bengal
21st-century Indian women politicians